Shahid Abdol Karim-e Maleki (also Romanized as Shahīd ʿAbdol Karīm-e Malekī and Shahīdabdolkarīm-e Malekī) is a village in Hasanabad Rural District, in the Central District of Eslamabad-e Gharb County, Kermanshah Province, Iran. At the 2006 census, its population was 575, in 137 families.

References 

Populated places in Eslamabad-e Gharb County